Yoshinori Fujimoto (born 25 October 1989) is a Japanese professional golfer.

As an amateur, Fujimoto won the individual silver medal at the 2011 Summer Universiade and led the Japan team to the gold medal.

Fujimoto turned professional in 2012 and joined the Japan Golf Tour. He won his first title in June 2012 at the Japan Golf Tour Championship Citibank Cup Shishido Hills, which qualified him for the 2012 Open Championship. Yoshinori was also named the 2012 Rookie of the Year. He won again the next season at the 2013 Toshin Golf Tournament.

Fujimoto was sponsored by ISPS for several years, but is now sponsored by Honma Golf.

In January 2019, Fujimoto qualified for the 2019 Open Championship with a runner-up finish at the SMBC Singapore Open. It was his second career appearance at the Open.

Professional wins (2)

Japan Golf Tour wins (2)

Japan Golf Tour playoff record (0–1)

Results in major championships

CUT = missed the half-way cut
"T" = tied

Results in World Golf Championships

"T" = Tied

Team appearances
Royal Trophy (representing Asia): 2012 (winners)

References

External links

Japanese male golfers
Japan Golf Tour golfers
Universiade medalists in golf
Universiade gold medalists for Japan
Universiade silver medalists for Japan
Medalists at the 2011 Summer Universiade
Sportspeople from Nara Prefecture
1989 births
Living people